Kemenche or Lyra is a name used for various types of stringed bowed musical instruments originating in the Eastern Mediterranean, particularly in Armenia, Greece, Iran, Turkey, and Azerbaijan. and regions adjacent to the Black Sea. These instruments are folk instruments, generally having three strings and played held upright with their tail on the knee of the musician. The name Kemenche derives from the Persian Kamancheh, meaning merely a "small bow".

Variations
The Kemençe of the Black Sea, also known as Pontic kemenche or Pontic lyra, is a box-shaped lute (), while the classical kemençe ( or Armudî kemençe) is a bowl-shaped lute ().

Other bowed instruments have names sharing the same Persian etymology include the kamancheh (or Kabak kemane in Turkish), a spike lute (), and the Cappadocian kemane, an instrument closely related to the kemenche of the Black Sea with added sympathetic strings. Though, Circassians of Caucasus also have the same instrument in their own language named as Shikepshine which basically means horse tail violin.

See also
 Byzantine lyra
 Pochette (musical instrument)

References

External links

Kemence, from Folk Tours Middle Eastern Dance & Music

Lyres
Bowed instruments
Laz musical instruments